James Richard Wong Yin Song (born 1960) is a Mauritian-Seychellois Anglican bishop. He is the archbishop and primate of the Anglican Province of the Indian Ocean, and fourth bishop of The Seychelles.

Ecclesiastical career
Wong was ordained an Anglican priest in 1983. He was afterwards the archdeacon of Mauritius and the rector of St Thomas' Beau Bassin. He was elected the fourth bishop of the Diocese of the Seychelles in 2009. Wong was granted Seychelles citizenship on 11 May 2017. He was elected archbishop of the Province of the Indian Ocean, at the provincial synod, held at St. Andrew's Church, Quatre-Bornes, Mauritius, on 26 August 2017, assuming office the following day.

Wong is a supporter of the Anglican realignment. He attended GAFCON III, in Jerusalem, on 17–22 June 2018.

References

1960 births
Living people
21st-century Anglican bishops in Africa
Anglican archbishops of the Indian Ocean
Archdeacons of Mauritius
Anglican bishops of Seychelles
Mauritian Anglicans
Seychellois people of Chinese descent
Anglican realignment people